The Evening Standard, formerly The Standard (1827–1904), also known as the London Evening Standard, is a local free daily newspaper in London, England, published Monday to Friday in tabloid format.

In October 2009, after being purchased by Russian businessman Alexander Lebedev, the paper ended a 180-year history of paid circulation and became a free newspaper, doubling its circulation as part of a change in its business plan. Emily Sheffield became editor in July 2020 but resigned in October 2021.

History

From 1827 to 2009 
The newspaper was founded by barrister Stanley Lees Giffard on 21 May 1827 as The Standard. The early owner of the paper was Charles Baldwin. Under the ownership of James Johnstone, The Standard became a morning paper from 29 June 1857. The Evening Standard was published from 11 June 1859. The Standard gained eminence for its detailed foreign news, notably its reporting of events of the American Civil War (1861–1865), the Austro-Prussian War of 1866, and the Franco-Prussian War of 1870, all contributing to a rise in circulation. By the end of the 19th century, the evening edition eclipsed its morning counterpart.

Both The Standard and the Evening Standard were acquired by C. Arthur Pearson in 1904. In May 1915, Edward Hulton purchased the Evening Standard from Davison Dalziel. Dalziel had purchased both papers in 1910, and closed The Standard, the morning paper, in 1916. Hulton introduced the gossip column Londoner's Diary, originally billed as "a column written by gentlemen for gentlemen".

In 1923, Lord Beaverbrook, owner of the Daily Express, bought Hulton's newspapers, although he sold them shortly thereafter to the Daily Mails owner Lord Rothermere, with the exception of the Standard. It became a staunchly Conservative paper, harshly attacking Labour in 1945 in a high-profile campaign that backfired. In the 1960s, the paper was upstaged by The Evening News, which sold over 1 million copies nightly. During the decade, the paper also began to publish the comic strip Modesty Blaise, which bolstered its sales throughout the 1970s. The Evening Standard ceased publishing on Saturdays on 30 November 1974, when it still produced six editions daily.

In 1980, Express Newspapers merged the Standard with Associated Newspapers' Evening News in a Joint Operating Agreement. The new paper was known as the New Standard until 1985, when Associated Newspapers bought out the remaining stake, turning it into The Standard. In 1987 the Evening News was briefly revived to compete with Robert Maxwell's London Daily News, but was reabsorbed into The Standard later that year, after the collapse of Maxwell's paper. In 1988 the Evening Standard included the by-line "Incorporating the 'Evening News'", which remained until the paper's sale in 2009.

Lebedev takeover 
On 21 January 2009, the Russian businessman and former KGB agent Alexander Lebedev and his son Evgeny Lebedev, owners of The Independent, agreed to acquire control of the Evening Standard for £1 for 64 percent ownership. A few years earlier, 12 percent of the paper had been sold to Justin Shaw and Geordie Greig. Associated Newspapers retained the remaining 24 percent.

In November 2009, it was announced that the London Evening Standard would drop its midday "News Extra" edition from 4 January 2010. From then on, the first edition was the West End Final, available from 2 pm. One edition of 600,000 copies would be printed starting at 12:30 pm, ending 3 am starts for journalists and the previous deadline of 9 am for the first edition. Twenty people were expected to lose their jobs as a result.

Previously there were three editions each weekday, excluding Bank holidays. The first, "News Extra", went to print at 10:00 am and was available around 11 am in central London, slightly later in more outlying areas. A second edition, "West End Final", went to print at 3 pm, and the "Late Night Final" went to print at 5 pm and was available in central London from about 6 pm. There were often considerable changes between editions, particularly with the front-page lead and following few pages, including the Londoner's Diary, though features and reviews stayed the same. In January 2010, circulation was increased to 900,000.

May 2009 relaunch 

In May 2009, the newspaper launched a series of poster ads, each of which prominently featured the word "Sorry" in the paper's then-masthead font. These ads offered various apologies for past editorial approaches, such as "Sorry for losing touch". None of the posters mentioned the Evening Standard by name, although they featured the paper's Eros logo. Ex-editor Veronica Wadley criticised the "Pravda-style" campaign saying it humiliated the paper's staff and insulted its readers. The campaign was designed by McCann Erickson. Also in May 2009 the paper relaunched as the London Evening Standard with a new layout and masthead, marking the occasion by giving away 650,000 free copies on the day, and refreshed its sports coverage.

October 2009: freesheet 
After a long history of paid circulation, on 12 October 2009 the Standard became a free newspaper, with free circulation of 700,000, limited to central London. In February 2010, a paid-for circulation version became available in suburban areas of London for 20p (although many places sell it for 50p). The newspaper won the Media Brand of the Year and the Grand Prix Gold awards at the Media Week awards in October 2010. The judges said, "[the Standard has] quite simply ... stunned the market. Not just for the act of going free, but because editorial quality has been maintained, circulation has almost trebled and advertisers have responded favourably. Here is a media brand restored to health." The Standard also won the daily newspaper of the year award at the London Press Club Press Awards in May 2011.

May 2010: mobile application 
The Evening Standard launched a mobile app with US app developer Handmark in May 2010. The range of apps was updated in 2015.

March 2018: redesign 
In March 2018, editor George Osborne initiated a redesign of the paper, which featured a dropping of the 'London' from the paper's title in a signal of the paper's ambition to have greater national and international influence. The paper also introduced more colourful "sign-posting" for different sections such as news, comment, and business, as it was noted by Osborne that it had not been "easy" to find them inside the paper previously. The masthead was also redesigned with a new font, and emojis were added to the paper's five-day weather forecast.

May 2018: financial sponsorship 
In May 2018, James Cusick of openDemocracy alleged the newspaper had been providing favourable news coverage to companies including Uber and Google in exchange for financial sponsorship.

2019 and 2020 job cuts 
In June 2019, the Evening Standard announced job cuts. By the end of 2019, the company reported a pre-tax loss of £13.6 million. In August 2020, the paper announced a further 115 job cuts in order to save the company.

2022 
The Evening Standard endorsed Liz Truss in the July–September 2022 Conservative Party leadership election.

Editorial style 
From July 2020 to October 2021, the newspaper's editor was Emily Sheffield, sister of Samantha Cameron, who took over from the former Chancellor of the Exchequer George Osborne, who has now taken over the role of editor-in-chief. As editor he had replaced Sarah Sands who, in turn, had replaced Geordie Greig following his departure to The Mail on Sunday in March 2012. Veronica Wadley was the newspaper's editor between 2002 and 2009. Max Hastings was editor from 1996 until he retired in 2002.

The Evening Standard, although a regional newspaper, does cover national and international news, though with an emphasis on London-centred news (especially in its features pages), covering building developments, property prices, traffic schemes, politics, the congestion charge and, in the Londoner's Diary page, gossip on the social scene. It also occasionally runs campaigns on local issues that national newspapers do not cover in detail.

It has a tradition of providing arts coverage. Its best known former art critic, Brian Sewell, was known for his acerbic view of conceptual art, Britart and the Turner Prize and his views attracted controversy and criticism in the art world. He has been described as "Britain's most famous and controversial art critic".

During the 2008 London mayoral election the newspaper – and particularly the correspondent Andrew Gilligan – published articles in support of the Conservative candidate, Boris Johnson, including frequent front-page headlines condemning Ken Livingstone. This included the headline "Suicide bomb backer runs Ken's campaign".

On 5 May 2010, the newspaper stated in an editorial that, having supported Labour under Tony Blair, the newspaper would be supporting David Cameron and the Conservatives in the General Election, saying that "the Conservatives are ready for power: they look like a government in waiting." On 5 May 2015, an editorial stated that the newspaper would again be supporting David Cameron and the Conservatives in the 2015 General Election, saying that the Conservatives have "shown themselves to be good for London." The newspaper did however also claim "there may be good tactical reasons to vote Liberal Democrat."

The Media Reform Coalition (MRC) and Goldsmiths University of London argued that in the 2016 elections, the Evening Standard favoured the Conservative Party, according to MRC chair Justin Schlosberg. There were almost twice as many positive headlines about the Conservative candidate, Zac Goldsmith, as for his Labour rival, Sadiq Khan, with stories exhibiting the strongest bias against Khan also being the most prominent.

During the 2019 Conservative leadership election, the Evening Standard endorsed Boris Johnson. During the 2020 Labour leadership election, the Evening Standard endorsed Keir Starmer to become Labour leader and consequently Leader of the Opposition.

Freesheet and supplements 

On 14 December 2004, Associated Newspapers launched a Monday–Friday freesheet edition of the Evening Standard called Standard Lite to help boost circulation. This had 48 pages, compared with about 80 in the main paper, which also had a supplement on most days.

In August 2006, the freesheet was relaunched as London Lite. It was designed to be especially attractive to younger female readers and featured a wide range of lifestyle articles, but less news and business news than the main paper. It was initially available only between 11.30 a.m. and 2.30 p.m. at Evening Standard vendors and in the central area, but later became available in the evening from its street distributors. With the sale of the Evening Standard, but not the London Lite, to Alexander Lebedev on 21 January 2009, the ownership links between the Standard and the Lite were broken.

On Fridays, the newspaper includes a free glossy lifestyle magazine, ES (launched as the Evening Standard Magazine in 2009), and the circulation was increased to 350,000 in September 2014. This has moved from more general articles to concentrate on glamour, with features on the rich, powerful and famous. On Wednesdays, selected areas offer a free copy of the Homes & Property supplement, edited by Janice Morley, which includes London property listings as well as articles from lifestyle journalists including Barbara Chandler, Katie Law, and Alison Cork.

An entertainment guide supplement Metro Life (previously called Hot Tickets) was launched in September 2002. This was a what's-on guide with listings of cinemas and theatres in and around London and was given away on Thursdays. It was discontinued on 1 September 2005.

Website 
The newspaper's This Is London website carries some of the stories from the Evening Standard and promotions, reviews and competitions. It also includes a number of blogs by Evening Standard writers, such as restaurant critic Charles Campion, theatre critic Kieron Quirke and music critic David Smyth. A separate website contains images of each page of the print edition (two versions) and supplements.

Editors 

1827: Stanley Lees Giffard
1846: Robert Knox
1857: Thomas Hamber (The Standard)
1860: Charles Williams 
1863: Thomas Hamber
1870: James Johnstone Jr. and John Gorst
1876: W. H. Mudford
1899: Byron Curtis
1906: William Woodward
1912: James A. Kilpatrick
1914: D. M. Sutherland
1916: Arthur Mann
1920: D. Phillips
1923: E. Raymond Thompson
1928: George Gilliat
1933: Percy Cudlipp
1937: Reginald John Tanner Thompson
1938: Frank Owen
1942: Michael Foot
1943: Sydney Elliott
1945: Bert Gunn
1952: Percy Elland
1959: Charles Wintour
1976: Simon Jenkins
1978: Charles Wintour
1980: Louis Kirby
1986: John Leese
1991: Paul Dacre
1992: Stewart Steven
1996: Max Hastings
2002: Veronica Wadley
2009: Geordie Greig
2012: Sarah Sands
2017: George Osborne
2020: Emily Sheffield
2021: Charlotte Ross (acting)
2022: Jack Lefley  (acting)

References

External links 

 Evening Standard stories from the Evening Standard
 London Evening Standard E-edition (requires registration to view)
 London Evening Standard | Media | The Guardian

 
London newspapers
Conservative media in the United Kingdom
Daily newspapers published in the United Kingdom
Evening newspapers
Free daily newspapers
Publications established in 1827
1827 establishments in England
Daily Mail and General Trust
Podcasting companies